Bowland Forest High is a civil parish in the Ribble Valley district of Lancashire, England, covering some  of the Forest of Bowland.  According to the 2001 census, the parish had a population of 163, falling to 144 at the 2011 Census. The parish includes the settlements of Hareden, Sykes, and Dunsop Bridge.  It covers Sykes Fell, Whins Brow, Croasdale Fell and Wolfhole Crag.  Before 1974, it formed part of Bowland Rural District in the West Riding of Yorkshire.

History

Historic Bowland comprised a Royal Forest and a Liberty of ten manors spanning eight townships and four parishes and covered an area of almost  on the historic borders of Lancashire and Yorkshire.   The manors within the Liberty  were Slaidburn (Newton-in-Bowland, West Bradford, Grindleton), Knowlmere, Waddington, Easington, Bashall, Mitton, Withgill (Crook), Leagram (Bowland-with-Leagram), Hammerton and Dunnow (Battersby).  Modern-day Bowland Forest is divided into two large administrative townships -  Great Bowland (Bowland Forest High and Bowland Forest Low) and Little Bowland (Bowland-with-Leagram) - but the Forest was much more extensive in previous times.

St Hubert, the patron saint of hunting, is also patron saint of the Forest of Bowland and has a chapel dedicated to him in Dunsop Bridge. This chapel was founded by Richard Eastwood of Thorneyholme, land agent to the Towneley family.  Eastwood was the last Bowbearer of the Forest of Bowland during the nineteenth century. An acclaimed breeder of racehorses and shorthorn cattle, he died in 1871 and is buried at St Hubert's.

Media gallery

See also

Listed buildings in Bowland Forest High

References

Civil parishes in Lancashire
Geography of Ribble Valley
Forest of Bowland